Robert Frey may refer to:

 Robert G. Frey (born 1938 or 1939), Kansas state legislator
 Robert J. Frey, banker and researcher in quantitative finance